Oceans of Fire is a 1986 American TV film.

Cast
Gregory Harrison as Ben Laforche
Billy Dee Williams as Jim McKinley
Lyle Alzado as Witkowski
Tony Burton as Clay
Ray Mancini as Romano
Ken Norton as Chief
Lee Ving as Pembroke
Cynthia Sikes as Helen Kyger
David Carradine as J.C. Busch
R. G. Armstrong as Rusty West
Ramon Bieri as Chuck Horn
Alan Fudge as Bartlett
David Wohl as Ira Handel
Jeff Cooper as Handsome

Reception
It had an audience of 14 million.

References

External links
Oceans of Fire at BFI
Oceans of Fire at TCMDB
Oceans of Fire at IMDb

1986 television films
1986 films
American television films
Films directed by Steve Carver